Norwegian Church Aid (NCA; Norwegian: Kirkens Nødhjelp) is a Norwegian humanitarian and ecumenical organisation with headquarters in Oslo. It was traditionally affiliated with the state Church of Norway, but is now independent. Norwegian Church Aid works together with people and organisations across the world to eradicate poverty and injustice.

Work

NCA provides emergency assistance in disasters and works for long-term development in local communities. In order to address  the root causes of poverty, NCA advocates for just decisions by public authorities, business and religious leaders.

Norwegian Church Aid is an ecumenical organisation for global justice. Its projects are carried out with no intention of influencing people's religious affiliation.

To ensure efficiency and create results, Norwegian Church Aid is a member of the ACT Alliance, one of the world's largest humanitarian alliances. The alliance consists of church-based organisations throughout the world and cooperates with organisations across religious faiths.

Norwegian Church Aid works in three ways:
 Emergency preparedness and response: saving lives and protecting people in emergency situations
 Long-term development aid: supporting local communities to achieve development over time
 Advocacy: promoting democracy and human rights by influencing decision-making processes

The organisation works in over 30 countries in Africa, Asia and Central and Latin America.

In 2018 the Norwegian Church Aid and five other key NGOs organise the customary torchlight parade in Oslo in honour of that year's Nobel Peace Prize laureates, Denis Mukwege and Nadia Murad, who were awarded the prize for their work to end the use of sexual violence as a weapon of war.

Changemaker 
Norwegian Church Aid’s youth movement, Changemaker, organises campaigns, courses, camps and local projects for its many thousands of members aged 13 - 30. Changemaker's main priority is to encourage young people to take an interest in global issues and speak out against injustice. Changemaker's offices are housed within NCA's headquarters in Oslo.

References

External links
ACT Alliance
Changemaker
Norwegian Church Aid

Church Aid, Norwegian
Religious organisations based in Norway